The Oulu Bus Station is a bus station in the city center of Oulu, Finland, located in the Vaara district near the Raksila district. From the bus station there is a pedestrian connection via the railway underpass tunnel to Oulu railway station and the station pier. There is no longer a ticket office and the Matkahuolto service in the station building, but there is still a café in the building.

The bus station was originally built in Torinranta on the site of the current Autoranta parking area in 1937. The Oulu City Council decided to build a new station as early as 1963, but the new existing bus station was only opened in November 1983. Today, the bus station has received a lot of criticism for its old and dilapidated due to its condition, which is no longer subject to renovation.

Next to the bus station building is Martti Aiha's sculpture Futura – Tuntematon.

References

External links

Buildings and structures in Oulu
Bus stations in Finland
Transport in Oulu